Esperstedt is a former municipality in the district Kyffhäuserkreis, in Thuringia, Germany. Since 1 December 2007, it is part of the town Bad Frankenhausen.

Former municipalities in Thuringia